King George Street (Rehov ha-Melekh Jorj) is a street in Tel Aviv named for King George V of the United Kingdom who reigned during the British Mandate of Palestine. The street extends from Masaryk Square in the north to Magen David Square in the south, where it meets with Allenby Street, the Carmel Market, and Nahalat Binyamin Street.

At the beginning of the 1920s, the street was called "Carmel Street." In 1935, it was changed to its current name to mark the occasion of the king's Silver Jubilee. Following the death of Israeli Prime Minister Yitzhak Shamir in 2012, his family proposed the street be renamed after him. The western section of the street is still called "Carmel Street", which is where the Carmel Market is located. 

The street is a bustling commercial centre with many stores, restaurants and coffee shops. It is adjacent to the Carmel Market, as well as Dizengoff Center mall on Dizengoff Street.

Among the notable sites are:
 Michael's Square
 Dizengoff Center
 Magen David Square
 Carmel Market
 Meir Garden
 Metzudat Ze'ev

Streets in Tel Aviv